Alfred Günter Rudi Hoffmann (20 December 1914 – 4 July 1983) was a German ice hockey player. He competed in the men's tournaments at the 1952 Winter Olympics and the 1956 Winter Olympics.

References

External links

1914 births
1983 deaths
Ice hockey people from Berlin
Ice hockey players at the 1952 Winter Olympics
Ice hockey players at the 1956 Winter Olympics
Olympic ice hockey players of Germany
Olympic ice hockey players of the United Team of Germany